Paul Logan Stone (born October 15, 1973) is an American actor, model, martial artist, stuntman, producer and screenwriter. He is best known for his roles in low budget action films such as Syfy's Mega Piranha. Logan is also known for his portrayal of Glen Reiber on the NBC soap opera, Days of Our Lives.

Education
Logan completed a degree in biochemistry at State University of New York at Purchase and followed this with courses of Chiropractic at the Los Angeles College of Chiropractic.

Career
After a few small parts on a few early films and television episodes, Logan gained better screen time with the movie Killers in 1997. Logan would also appear in the Triple-B genre film, L.E.T.H.A.L. Ladies: Return to Savage Beach. A year later he made appearances in the TNT television series' L.A. Heat and UPN's Malcolm & Eddie. In 2000, Logan appeared in the mockumentary, The Independent. In 2001, he appeared in the Buffy the Vampire Slayer spin-off, Angel. In that same year Logan was cast as Glen Reiber in Days of Our Lives.

In 2003, Logan made a guest appearance in an episode of the NBC television sitcom, Friends. He followed this up with a series of action films such as The Eliminator, Curse of the Komodo and Way of the Vampire where he portrayed Dracula.

In 2008, Logan appeared in The Terminators. A year later, Logan's athletic background came in handy for the martial art-styled action film, Ballistica, with a leading role as a top-notch CIA agent trained in the title art of Ballistica (hand-to-hand combat with firearms). In that same year, he appeared alongside Brittany Murphy in the disaster film Megafault. Logan's third film with The Asylum saw him in a leading role as the US commando sent to South America to stop mutating killer-fish in the SyFy original Mega Piranha. The film garnered 2.2 million viewers on the network, making it the channel's most-watched film of the year so far.

Most recently, Logan would write, produce and star in the 2016 action horror film, The Horde.

In 2018, Logan starred in the movie Running Out Of Time as the character Trent on BET and BET Her.

Filmography

Film

Television

References

External links
 
 

Living people
1973 births
American male film actors
American male soap opera actors
Male actors from New Jersey
State University of New York at Purchase alumni